The 2008 Grand Prix motorcycle racing season was the 60th F.I.M. Road Racing World Championship season. The season consisted out of 18 races for the MotoGP class and 17 for the 125cc and 250cc classes, beginning with the Qatar motorcycle Grand Prix on 9 March 2008 and ending with the Valencian Community motorcycle Grand Prix on 26 October.

Season review

MotoGP
The MotoGP class opened with the historic Qatar Grand Prix, the first night race held in the World Championship history. The race was won by Ducati's Casey Stoner ahead of rookie Jorge Lorenzo, who started on pole in his maiden race in the premier class, and Dani Pedrosa.

In Spain Pedrosa won his first race of the year, ahead of Rossi and Lorenzo, while Stoner struggled with technical problems on his bike and finished 11th after twice going out on the gravel. At the Portugal GP, Lorenzo started on pole and won his first MotoGP race, ahead of Pedrosa and Rossi.

In China Rossi took his first win of the season and the first of three consecutive first places, after a weekend dominated by rain and cold temperatures; he then won in France and in front of his home crowd in Italy.

Stoner won the three consecutive races in Britain, the Netherlands and Germany, also obtaining pole position and the fastest lap in all three.

The United States race at Laguna Seca was the biggest turning point of the season. Before the race Stoner trailed Rossi on the standings by only 20 points. The Australian took pole position and started the race in first position. However, Rossi passed Stoner in the middle on the first lap, and Stoner could never make a decisive pass, and he stayed behind until the 24th lap, where he fell at the last corner. He re-mounted, but finished in second place while Rossi caught the first of five consecutive wins. In the next two races, Czech Republic and San Marino, Stoner fell off while leading from Rossi, who then won both times.

The race at Indianapolis was a particularly difficult due to track conditions: the arrival of Hurricane Ike over Indiana meant cold temperatures, heavy winds and rain for the whole race duration; the race was a battle between Rossi and former World Champion Nicky Hayden, who eventually took his first podium of the season. As Rossi began to pull a gap, heavy winds began to blow and the race was ended early with Rossi leading.

Two weeks later, in Japan, Rossi clinched his sixth premier class title with three races to go, by winning the race ahead of Stoner. The Australian then won his home race and in Valencia, while Rossi won in Malaysia.

2008 MotoGP season was also final season for Michelin tyres, from 2009 until 2015 seasons Bridgestone would take over the single tyre partner and supplier role for MotoGP class.

250cc class
The first four races of the season showed the early form of KTM and Mika Kallio, with two wins and two other third places, with strong showings by Marco Simoncelli, Alvaro Bautista and Mattia Pasini, who won the season opener in Qatar, his first race in the class. After the initial problems, though, Simoncelli had a run of 7 consecutive races on the podium, from China to Czech Republic. He started the season on a semi-works Aprilia LE (Gilera is a subsidiary of Aprilia, so Gilera racing bikes are rebranded Aprilia bikes), but his performances led Aprilia to give him a works Aprilia RSA, making him a de facto works rider.

After his strong start, Kallio couldn't keep the pace of Simoncelli, his KTM not being able to challenge the more powerful Aprilias in most tracks. Bautista got into shape well into the season, after a series of bad races and retirements due to problems with his bike and rider errors. After that, however, he also began a streak of podiums which lasted from Catalunya to Malaysia, but Simoncelli was too far ahead of him on the standings, and he won his first World Championship with one race to go.

125cc class
Reigning champion Gábor Talmácsi stayed in the class, unlike other top names from last year who moved into 250cc category. Among the pre-season favourites were also Bradley Smith, Simone Corsi and Mike di Meglio. Talmácsi had dismal start to the season, with reliability problems on his new bike. Corsi won three of first six races and despite few bad results, looked good in the championship. However, Mike di Meglio won also multiple races, and having escaped without retirement until Misano, built up strong lead. He clinched the championship two races before the end. Corsi took second ahead of Talmácsi and Bradl who failed to finish the final race.

The season saw eight riders winning races: Talmácsi, Corsi, di Meglio, Sergio Gadea and four first-time winners: Andrea Iannone, Stefan Bradl, Nicolás Terol and Scott Redding, who became the youngest ever winner in the class. The season was completely dominated by the Piaggio bikes, (Aprilia, Derbi and Gilera), as Spanish Marc Márquez was only other rider to achieve podium place with his 3rd place in Donington.

2008 Grand Prix season calendar
The following Grands Prix were scheduled to take place in 2008:

The 2008 race schedule was released in July 2007. The schedule was later revised, with Japan held before Australia, because of the original Australian date had a conflict with the AFL Grand Final. Two other changes were made. Portugal was moved from 20 April to 13 April and the Grand Finale in Valencia was on 26 October instead of 2 November, to avoid clashes with the F1 season finale.

‡ = Night race
 † = MotoGP class only
 †† = Saturday race

Calendar changes
 The Turkish Grand Prix was taken off the calendar.
 The Portuguese Grand Prix was moved forward, from 16 September to 13 April to fill the gap of the Turkish Grand Prix.
 Only the MotoGP class raced during the United States Grand Prix because of a Californian law on air pollution, preventing the 125 and 250cc classes from racing.
 The Indianapolis Grand Prix was added to the calendar.

Regulation changes
The following changes are made to the regulation for the 2008 season:

Sporting regulations

 The paddock rules have been updated. When the paddock is occupied, it is mandatory to have sufficient medical and fire fighting service available to all riders, teams, manufacturers, sponsors, officials and so on. The services must be accessible from 08:00 to 18:00 at minimum for two days before the setting up of the teams day and on a 24-hour basis for the rest of the event, ending at 00:00 on the day after race day.
 Restrictions have been put in place for tyre testing during practice. Tyre manufacturers that supply tyres in the MotoGP class are allowed to, before the first event of each year, nominate and inform the Race Direction of one circuit as their testing venue where they can practice during the season, as well as the breaks with MotoGP class bikes during a maximum of four days or a part thereof, but not with riders designated by trams and not before the event that will take place at that track. If it is requested by any tyre manufacturer who supplies tyres to the MotoGP class then a two-day test must be organised, but not with riders who are appointed by the teams, at least four weeks before any event is scheduled for a circuit that was not in the championship of last year or that, in the opinion of the Grand Prix Commission, has been significantly resurfaced since the last event at that venue.
 All MotoGP riders may now use a generator to power tyre warmers on the grid. Only one generator can be used per bike. The generator must be portable by hand and have a maximum output capacity of two Kilowatt. The spare bike may remain inside the pits until it will be used in the race, by any exchange of bike must be done in the pit lane.
 Behaviour during the practice and race has been updated. Riders can enter the pits during the race, but taking the motorcycle inside their pit box is prohibited. In the MotoGP class, in the case of a bike change during a race, if a bike that has been used in the race enters the pit box, it will be deemed as 'retired' and can not be used again in the same race. Refuelling is strictly forbidden and anyone who breaks this rule will be penalised with disqualification.
 If a winning rider wants to parade a flag around, he must rider to the side of the track to collect the flag, then rejoin the circuit when it is safe to do so.
 Any rider, team, manufacturer, official and so on, has the right to protest against a decision taken by the FIM. No protest may be entered against a statement of fact of the Race Direction requiring or not:
 - a position change.
 - a ride through penalty.
 - a disqualification from the practice sessions or races via a black flag or black flag with orange disc.
 - a fine for speeding in the pit lane.

It is also forbidden to lodge a protest against a statement of fact of the Race Direction based on a photo finish.

 All protests have to be submitted and signed by the person who is directly concerned with the matter only. Each protest has to refer to a single subject only and must be presented within one hour at the latest after the publication of the official results or a notification from a decision taken by the Race Direction. Any protest must be given to a responsible official, which can be a Clerk of the Course, Race Director or Secretary of the Meeting, together with a security payment of 700 US Dollar or similar. All teams and riders who are contracted to participate in the championship can submit a letter of guarantee from the IRTA in the position of payment.

Technical regulations

 All engines in the MotoGP class up to 800cc will now have unlimited cylinders.
 Clarifications have been made regarding the use of engines. Engines may run on the two-stroke or four-stroke principal only. Only four-strokes are allowed in the MotoGP class whilst the 125cc and 250cc classes use the two-stroke engines. The normal section of each engine cylinder and piston in plan must be circular. Circular section cylinders and pistons are defined as 'having less than 5% difference in the diameter measured at any two points'.
 Fuel tank breather pipes have to incorporate a non-return valve. They must also discharge into a suitable container which is one per bike with a maximum capacity of 200cc and a maximum capacity of 250cc.
 The fuel tank capacities for all MotoGP bikes is set at a maximum of 21 litres.
 Refuelling may only be done from an unpressurised container and the fuel tank can not be artificially pressurised above an areal pressure at any time. It is allowed to vent the fuel tank to the atmosphere via the airbox in order to equalise pressure in the airbox and fuel tank.
 Stops must be fitted to make sure that there is a space of at least 30mm between the handlebar and fuel tank frame and/or bodywork when at the extremes of steering lock.
 Bodywork changes have been made. The seat unit must have a maximum height of the (approximate) vertical section behind the riders seating position, which is 150mm. The measurement will be taken at a 90° angle to the upper surface of the flat base at the riders seating position, excluding any seatpad or covering. Any on-board camera or antenna which is mounted on the seat unit is not added in this measurement.
 Mudguards are not required. When adjusted, front mudguards must not expand in front of a line drawn upwards and forwards at 45 degrees from a horizontal line through the front wheel spindle, as well as below a line drawn horizontally and to the rear of the front wheel spindle. The mudguard mounts/brackets and fork-leg covers, which are close to the suspension leg and wheel spindle, as well as the brake disc covers are not considered to be a part of the mudguard.
 In the 125cc and 250cc classes, the main body of the number used on the bike must be of a single colour which is particular and strongly differentiates with the background colour.
 The amount of allowed tyres to use before the start of a race weekend has been increased. Instead of using a maximum of 31 slick tyres (14 front and 17 rear), the amount has been upped to 40 tyres (18 front and 22 rear). Tyre supplier Dunlop will still be excluded from these restrictions due to the fact that the company has not yet won the minimal two MotoGP races required for this rule.

2008 Grand Prix season results

 ‡ = Night race
 † = MotoGP class only
 †† = Saturday race

Footnotes

Participants

MotoGP participants

250cc participants

125cc participants

Standings

MotoGP riders' standings
Scoring system
Points were awarded to the top fifteen finishers. Rider had to finish the race to earn points.

 Rounds marked with a light blue background were under wet race conditions or stopped by rain.
 Riders marked with light blue background were eligible for Rookie of the Year awards.

250cc riders' standings
Scoring system
Points were awarded to the top fifteen finishers. Rider had to finish the race to earn points.

 Rounds marked with a light blue background were under wet race conditions or stopped by rain.
 Riders marked with light blue background were eligible for Rookie of the Year awards.

125cc riders' standings
Scoring system
Points were awarded to the top fifteen finishers. Rider had to finish the race to earn points.

 Rounds marked with a light blue background were under wet race conditions or stopped by rain.
 Riders marked with light blue background were eligible for Rookie of the Year awards.

Constructors' standings
Scoring system
Points were awarded to the top fifteen finishers. A rider had to finish the race to earn points.
 

 Each constructor gets the same number of points as their best placed rider in each race.
 Rounds marked with a light blue background were under wet race conditions or stopped by rain.

MotoGP

250cc

125cc

Teams' standings
 Each team gets the total points scored by their two riders, including replacement riders. In one rider team, only the points scored by that rider will be counted. Wildcard riders do not score points.
 Rounds marked with a light blue background were under wet race conditions or stopped by rain.

MotoGP

References
 

 
Grand Prix motorcycle racing seasons
2008 in motorcycle sport